Wells is an English surname of Norman origin, but is possibly a Welsh surname, from an old English word for Wales. It normally derives from occupation, location, and topography. The occupational name (i.e. "Wellman") derives from the person responsible for a village's spring. The locational name (i.e. "Well") derives from the pre-7th century "" ("spring"). The topographical name (i.e. "Attewell") derives from living near a spring. The oldest public record is found in 1177 in the county of Norfolk. Variations of Wells include Well, Welman, Welles, Wellman and Wellsman. At the time of the British Census of 1881, its relative frequency was highest in Berkshire (3.2 times the British average), followed by Leicestershire, Oxfordshire, Kinross-shire, Huntingdonshire, Kent, Sussex, Lincolnshire, Dumfriesshire and Bedfordshire.



Origin 
It is said that the origin is sometimes derived from Roman Britain or Roman Empire because the city of Wells. Wells is an Old English surname of Norman origin but is possibly a Welsh surname, from an old English word for Wales. The meaning can be derived as the Roman god Neptune as “sea god”. Habitational name from any of several places named with the plural of Old English well(a) ‘spring’, ‘stream’, or a topopgraphical name from this word (in its plural form), for example Wells in Somerset or Wells-next-the-Sea in Norfolk. Translation of French Dupuis or any of its variants. Later an abbey church was built in Wells in 705 by Aldhelm, first bishop of the newly established Diocese of Sherborne during the reign of King Ine of Wessex. It was dedicated to St Andrew and stood at the site of the cathedral's cloisters, where some excavated remains can be seen. Wells gets its name from these springs which can today be found in the gardens of the Bishop's Palace. Wells is the smallest city in England with about 12,000 inhabitants. This was dated 1177, in the pipe rolls of the county of Norfolk, during the reign of Henry II of England, 1154–1189. Throughout the centuries, surnames in every country have continued to "develop" often leading to astonishing variants of the original. This probably denoted somebody responsible for looking after the village spring, although not necessarily in any other way associated with the various places called Well or Wells. Early examples of church register recordings include Robert Wells, who was christened on January 7, 1557, at Christchurch Greyfriars, in the city of London, whilst Richard Wellman was recorded at St Georges Chapel, Hanover Square, Westminster, on March 1, 1730.

Variants 
The old Anglo-Saxon word waella meant spring (rather than a well) and probably a spring associated with a holy place.  In Kent and East Anglia this word seems to have been pronounced “wella,” from which has come the surname Wells and, in Sussex, Atwell (at the well).

Bearers of the surname

A 
 Alan Wells (born 1961), English cricketer
 Alexander H. Wells (d. 1857), New York lawyer, newspaper editor and politician 
 Alexander Wells (baseball) (born 1997), Australian baseball player
 Alfred Wells (1814–1867), U.S. Representative from New York
 Alfred Wells (1859–1935), architect in South Australia
 Alice Wells, American diplomat and U.S. Ambassador to Jordan
 Alice Stebbins Wells (1873–1957), first female officer in Los Angeles Police Dept
 Alisa Wells (born Alice Wells; November 26, 1927 – January 5, 1988)
 Allan Wells (born 1952) Scottish Olympic athlete
 Alphege of Wells (or Ælfheah, died c.937), third Anglo-Saxon Bishop of Wells 
 Andy Wells (Canadian politician), mayor of St. John's, Newfoundland and Labrador
 Andy Wells (American politician) (born 1954), politician in North Carolina
 Andrew Wells, character in the U.S. television series Buffy the Vampire Slayer
 Angus Wells (1943–2006), British writer of genre fiction, including fantasy and westerns
 Audrey Wells (1960–2018), American screenwriter, film director and producer

B
 Basil Wells (Basil Eugene Wells, 1912–2003), American writer
 Ben Wells (actor) (born 1982), American television and film actor
 Ben Wells (American Guitarist) for southern rock band "Black Stone Cherry"
 Ben Wells (footballer), English footballer
 Benjamin W. Wells (1856–1923), American scholar and editor
 Bertram Whittier Wells (1884–1978), American botanist and ecologist 
 Bill Wells, Scottish musician 
 Bill Wells (footballer) (William George "Bill" Wells, a.k.a. "Bomber" Wells, 1920–2013), Australian Rules footballer
 Billy Wells (football player) (William Prescott Wells, 1931–2001), American footballer 
 Billy Wells (footballer) (William Charles Richard Wells, 1916–1984), Australian Rules footballer
 Bob Wells (baseball) (Robert Lee Wells, born 1966), American baseball pitcher
 Bob Wells (vandweller) (born 1955/1956), American YouTuber
 Bomber Wells (Bryan Douglas Wells, 1930–2008), English cricketer 
 Bonzi Wells (Gawen DeAngelo Wells, born 1976), American professional basketball player
 Boomer Wells (David Lee Wells, born 1963), American baseball pitcher 
 Bowen Wells (born 1935), British politician
 Briant H. Wells (1871–1949), American major general
 Bruce Wells (1933–2009), English boxer
 Bubba Wells (Charles Richard "Bubba" Wells, born 1974), American basketball player
 Bulkeley Wells (1872–1931), "colourful character"

C

 Cal Wells, American businessman
 Caroline Louise Josephine Wells (1856–1939), first professionally qualified female dentist in Ontario, Canada.
 Carolyn Wells (1862–1942), American author and poet
 Casper Wells, American baseball player
 Charles Wells (disambiguation)
 Charlie Wells (Charles Wells 1892–1929), Australian Rules footballer
 Charlie Wells (Charles Harding Wells 1923–2004), Mississippi hardboiled mystery writer
 Charlotte Fowler Wells, 19th-century American phrenologist and publisher
 Charlotte Wells, 21st-century Scottish film director
 Chris Wells (disambiguation)
 Clara Louisa Wells (c.1850-c.1925), American writer and inventor 
 Clark Henry Wells (1822–1888), U.S. Navy Rear Admiral
 Claudia Wells (born 1966), American actress
 Clifford Wells (1896–1977), American basketball coach 
 Clyde Kirby Wells (born 1937), Chief Justice of the Supreme Court of Newfoundland and Labrador
 Colin Wells (disambiguation)
 Concetta Fierravanti-Wells (aka "Connie", born 1960), Australian politician
 Cory Wells (1942–2015), American singer (Three Dog Night)
 Cyril Wells (1871–1963), English cricketer, rugby footballer and schoolmaster

D

 Daniel Wells (disambiguation)
 David Wells (disambiguation)
 Dawn Wells (1938–2020), American actress
 Dean Wells (disambiguation)
 Deane Wells (born 1949), Australian politician
 Delores Wells (born 1937), American model, actress, Playboy Playmate June 1960
 Derek Wells (born 1946), Canadian politician, lawyer and businessman
 Dicky Wells (William Wells, 1907–1985), American jazz trombonist
 Dino Wells (David R. Wells Jr, born 1971), American actor, writer and production assistant
 Dolly Wells (born 1971), English actress
 Doris Wells (1943–1988), Venezuelan actress, writer, and director
 Dustin Wells (born 1983), Australian soccer player

E

 EJ Wells and Samantha Brady, fictional characters from the American soap opera Days of our Lives
 Earle Wells (born 1933), New Zealand Olympic Gold medallist in yachting 
 Ed Wells (baseball) (1900–1986), American baseball pitcher, nickname "Satchelfoot"
 Edmund W. Wells (1846–1938), American jurist, businessman, and politician.
 Edward Wells (theologian) (1667–1727), English mathematician, geographer, and controversial theologian
 Edward Wells (MP) (1821–1910), English Conservative Party politician, MP for Wallingford 1872–80
 Edward Curtis Wells (1910–1986), director of Boeing Company, designer of the Boeing 747
 Edward Wells (RNZAF officer) (1916–2005), New Zealand flying ace of the Second World War
 Emmeline B. Wells (1828–1921), American journalist, editor, poet, women's rights advocate and diarist 
 Erastus Wells (1823–1893), American politician and businessman
 Erik Wells, contemporary American politician and former television news anchor
 Evelyn Wells, 20th century biographer and author

F

 Fay Gillis Wells (1908–2002), pioneer aviator, journalist and broadcaster
 Frank Wells (1932–1994), American entertainment businessman

G

 G. Wells (Sussex cricketer), English cricketer active 1814–1821
 G. P. Wells, English astronomer (Guy Paul Wells FRAS)
 G. P. Wells (George Philip Wells, 1901–1985), zoologist, author and son of H. G. Wells
 Gary L. Wells, American Psychology Professor and Researcher (born 1950)
 Garrett Wells, fictional attorney on the American TV legal series Boston Legal
 Gawen DeAngelo "Bonzi" Wells (born 1976), American basketball player 
 Geoffrey of Wells (Galfridius Fontibus), mid-twelfth-century English hagiographer 
 George Wells (disambiguation)
 Georgeann Wells, American basketball player active in the 1980s
 Gisa (Bishop of Wells), also spelt Giso, bishop from 1060 to 1088
 Greg Wells (born 1968), Canadian musician and record producer
 Greg Wells (baseball) (born 1954), American baseball player
 Greg Wells (footballer, born 1950), Australian rules footballer 
 Greg Wells (footballer, born 1952), Australian rules footballer
 Guilford Wiley Wells (1840–1909), U.S. Representative from Mississippi

H 
 Harrison Wells, a fictional character
 Harry Wells (disambiguation)
 Heber Manning Wells (1859–1938), American politician, first governor of Utah
 Helen Wells (1910–1986), author of nurse Cherry Ames books, a series for young teens
 Helena Wells, later Whitford (1761?- 1824), American-English novelist and writer
 Henry Wells (disambiguation)
 Herbert George Wells (H. G. Wells, 1866–1946), prolific British science fiction writer and Fabian socialist
 Herbert Wells (soccer) (born 1901), U.S. soccer player
 Herman B Wells (1902–2000), 11th president of Indiana University
 Holly Wells (1991–2002), British murder victim in the 2002 Soham murders
 Horace Wells (1815–1848), pioneering American dentist
 Horatio Wells (1807–1858), American lawyer and politician
 Hugh de Wells, (d. 1235), medieval Bishop of Lincoln.
 Humphrey Wells, former Governor of Georgia

I

 Ida B. Wells (1862–1931), African American civil rights leader 
 Ima Wells (1936–2014), American educator and politician
 Ira K. Wells (1871–1934), American lawyer and federal judge

J

 J. Wells (born Jon Wells, 1982), record producer and occasional rapper
 Jabez H. Wells (1853–1930), American politician and curler
 Jack Wells (disambiguation)
 Jair-Rôhm Parker Wells (born 1958), American free jazz bassist, composer and conceptualist
 James Wells (disambiguation)
 James Babbage Wells Jr. (1850–1923), Texan judge
 James L. Wells, New York State Treasurer 1915–1920
 James Madison Wells, Louisiana governor 1865–1867
 James Murray Wells, English entrepreneur (Glasses Direct)
 James Pearson Wells (1822–1896), Canadian farmer and political figure
 Jane Sinclair Wells (born 1952) British composer and saxophonist
 Jane Wells (born 1961), CNBC business news reporter
 Jared Wells (born 1981), American baseball pitcher
 Jason Wells (disambiguation) 
 Jay Wells (born 1959), Canadian ice hockey player
 Jayson Wells (born 1976), American basketball player
 Jean Wells, American artist
 Jeremy Wells (born 1977), New Zealand television personality
 Jerold Wells (1908–1999), English actor
 Jerry Lee Wells (1944–2014), American basketball player
 Jim L. Wells, American sports radio host 
 Jim Wells (politician) (born 1957), Irish politician 
 Jim Wells (baseball) (born 1955), American baseball coach 
 Jocelin of Wells (died 1242), medieval Bishop of Bath and Wells
 Jodie Wells and Pearl Wells, in Jacqueline Wilson's book My Sister Jodie
 Joey Wells (born 1965), Bahamian long jumper
 Jonathan Wells (disambiguation)
 John Wells (disambiguation)
 Joseph Wells (disambiguation)
 Jordan C. Wells, head coach of the Syracuse college football program from 1892
 Julie Elizabeth Wells (born 1935), more popularly known as Julie Andrews
 Juliette Wells, American author and Jane Austen specialist
 Junior Wells (1934–1998), born Amos Blakemore, was a blues vocalist and harmonica player 
 Junius F. Wells (1854–1930), first head of the Mormon "Young Men's Mutual Improvement Association"

K

 Keith Wells (1962–1994), convicted and executed murderer 
 Kent Wells (born 1967), American football player
 Kerry Anne Wells, Miss Australia and Miss Universe, 1972
 Killian Wells, American pop music artist and entrepreneur
 Kip Wells (born Robert Wells, 1977), American baseball player
 Kitty Wells (1919–2012), stage name of Ellen Deason, American country music singer
 Kristin Wells, the secret identity of the 1981 version of DC Comics Superwoman

L

 L. M. Wells (1862–1923), American actor of the silent era
 Lawrence Wells (1860–1938), Australian explorer
 Lee Wells (born 1971), American artist, curator, technology and art consultant 
 Lemuel H. Wells (1841–1936), first Bishop of the Episcopal Diocese of Spokane 
 Leo Wells (1917–2006), American baseball player
 Lesley B. Wells (born 1937), U.S. federal judge 
 Lightnin' Wells, American Piedmont blues multi-instrumentalist and singer 
 Lilian Wells (1911-2001), Australian church leader
 Linton Wells (1893–1976), American foreign correspondent, world traveller and pioneer broadcaster
 Lloyd C. A. Wells (1924–2005), American sports photographer and civil rights advocate
 Lloyd Wells (born c. mid-1940s), American jazz guitarist
 Lynn Wells, American civil rights activist during the 1960s

M

 Malcolm Wells (1926–2009), American architect, "father of modern earth-sheltered home"
 Margaret Bruce Wells (1909–1998), British artist and printmaker 
 Margot Wells (born 1952), Scottish sprinter and English sprint and fitness coach
 Mark Wells (born 1957), American ice hockey player
 Mark Wells (footballer) (born 1971), British soccer player
 Mark Wells (musician) (born 1973), Australian musician and record producer
 Martha Wells (born 1964), American fantasy and science fiction author
 Mary Wells (1943–1992), American singer
 Mary K. Wells (1920–2000), American television writer and actress 
 Matt Wells (television presenter), Canadian videographer, TV co-host and singer
 Matt Wells (boxer) (1886–1953), British Olympic and professional boxer
 Matthew Wells (field hockey) (born 1978), Australian Olympic field hockey defender 
 Matthew Wells (American football) (born 1990), American football player
 Meech Wells, American hip-hop music producer, son of Mary Wells
 Melissa F. Wells (born 1932), diplomat and former United States Ambassador 
 Michaele Pride-Wells (born 1956), American architect and educator 
 Mike Wells (defensive lineman) (born 1971), American footballer
 Mike Wells (quarterback) (born 1951), American footballer
 Milton Wells (1829–1906), American Union Civil War brevet brigadier general
 Monty Garland-Wells (1907–1993), English cricketer
 Murray C. Wells (born 1936), Australian economist

N

 Nahki Wells (born 1990), Bermudian professional footballer for Huddersfield Town
 Nathaniel Wells (1779–1852), landowner, magistrate and Britain's first black sheriff
 Nick Wells (born 1951), American heavyweight boxer
 Nina Mitchell Wells, American lawyer, academic and currently Secretary of State of New Jersey
 Noël Wells (born 1986), American comedian and actress
 Norm Wells, American football player

O

 Oliver Elwin Wells, American educator
 Orlando Wells (born 1973), British actor 
 George Orson Welles, American film director
 Owen A. Wells (1844–1935), U.S. Representative from Wisconsin 
 Owen Wells (basketball) (1950–1993)

P

 Patricia Wells (born 1946), US cookbook author
 Paul Wells (born 1966), Canadian journalist 
 Pearl Wells and Jodie Wells, in Jacqueline Wilson's book My Sister Jodie
 Percy Wells (1891–1964), British trade union official and Member of Parliament
 Percy Wells (businessman) (1825–1909) associated with marine civil engineering in South Australia.
 Peter Wells (disambiguation)
 Philip Steven Wells, Canadian hematologist
Pro Wells (born 1998), American football player

R

 Randall Wells (Albert Randall Wells, 1877–1942), English architect 
 Randy Wells (Randy David Wells, 1982) baseball pitcher
 Ray Wells (born 1980), American football player
 Rebecca Wells (born 1953), actress, playwright, author of Divine Secrets of the Ya-Ya Sisterhood 
 Reggie Wells (born 1980), American footballer
 Reginald Fairfax Wells (1877–1951), British artist and aviator
 Renward Wells (born 1970), Bahamian sprinter 
 Rhoshii Wells (1976–2008), American boxer
 Rob Wells (born 1972), Canadian songwriter, musician and record producer
 Robb Wells (born 1971), Canadian actor and screenwriter
 Robert Wells (disambiguation)
 Robin Wells (born 1959), American economist
 Robison Wells (born 1978), American novelist
 Rolla Wells (1856–1944), American politician
 Rosemary Wells, contemporary author of children's books
 Roy Wells (born 1978), American baseball player for the Seattle Mariners
 Rulon S. Wells (1854–1941), Utah politician 
 Rupert Mearse Wells (1835–1902), Canadian politician

S

 Sally Wells, fictional character in the Australian soap opera Neighbours
 Samuel Wells (1801–1868), American politician, Governor of Maine 
 Sarajane Wells (1913/1914 - 1987), American actress and educator
 Scott James Wells, contemporary American actor
 Scott Wells (American football) (born 1981)
 Shan Wells, contemporary American sculptor and political illustrator
 Sigar of Wells (died c. 996), Bishop of Wells
 Simon of Wells (died 1207), medieval Bishop of Chichester
 Simon Wells (born 1961), director, great-grandson of H. G. Wells 
 Spencer Wells (born 1969), geneticist and anthropologist
 Stanfield Wells, American Footballer active c. 1910
 Stanley Wells (born 1930), British Shakespeare scholar and academic
 Steven Wells (born 1960–2009), British journalist and author formerly based in USA
 Sue Wells, contemporary New Zealand author and city councillor
 Swithun Wells (c. 1536–1591), beatified English Catholic martyr

T

 Ted Wells, American criminal attorney
 Terry Wells (born 1963), American baseball pitcher
 Thomas Wells (disambiguation) 
 Todd Wells, contemporary American bicycle racer (cyclo-cross and mountain bike)
 Tommy Wells (born 1957), Washington, D.C., politician
 Tyler Wells (born 1994), American baseball player
 Tyrone Wells, contemporary American singer/songwriter in the folk pop genre

V

 Vernon Wells III (born 1978), American baseball player 
 Vernon Wells (actor) (born 1945), Australian film and television actor
 Vince Wells (born 1965), English cricketer

W

 W. Wells (Middlesex cricketer), English cricketer active 1791–1816
 W. Woodbury Wells (1860–1901), Canadian teacher, lawyer and political figure 
 Warren Wells (born 1942), American football player
 Wayne Richard Wells (1965–2014) (aka Wayne Static), American metal musician
 Wayne Wells (wrestler) (born 1946), American Olympic wrestler 
 William Wells (disambiguation)

Z
 Zach Wells (born Zachary Stephen Wells, 1981), American soccer goalkeeper
 Zachariah Wells (born 1976), Canadian poet, critic, essayist and editor 
 Zeb Wells, American comic book writer

Fictional characters
Chris Wells, a character in the 2008 television movie The Nanny Express

Bearers of the forename 
 Wells A. Hutchins (1818–1895), U.S. Representative from Ohio
 Wells Coates (1895–1958), Canadian-born English architect, designer and writer
 Wells Goodykoontz (1872–1944), American politician from West Virginia
 Wells Spicer (1831–1887?), American journalist, prospector, politician, lawyer and judge
 Wells Thompson (born 1983), American soccer player
 Wells Tower (born 1973), American writer of short stories and non-fiction
 Wells Twombly (1935–1977), American sportswriter and author

Bearers in other parts of the name 
 Berthold Wells Key (1895–1986), British Indian Army general
 Charles Wells Russell (1818–1867), Confederate politician during the American Civil War
 Elizabeth Anne Wells Cannon (1859–1942), women's suffragist and politician in Utah 
 Elizabeth Wells Gallup (1848–1934), American educator 
 George Wells Beadle (1903–1989), American scientist and Nobel Prize laureate  
 George Wells Parker (1882–1931), African American political activist and writer
 Henry Wells Tracy (1807–1886), American politician 
 Irene Wells Pennington (1898–2003), a very savvy lady
 James Wells Champney (1843–1903), American genre and portrait painter
 James Wells Robson (1867–1941), Canadian politician
 John Wells Foster (1815–1873), American geologist and palaeontologist
 Levi Wells Prentice (1851–1935), American still life and landscape painter
 Mary Wells Lawrence (born 1928), American advertising executive, first woman CEO of a listed company
 Reuben Wells Leonard (1860–1930), Canadian soldier, civil engineer, railroad and mining executive, and philanthropist
 Samuel Wells Morris (1786–1847), American politician
 Samuel Wells Williams (1812–1884), American linguist, missionary and sinologist
 Seth Wells Cheney (1810–1856), American artist
 Sharlene Wells Hawkes (born 1964 in Paraguay), Miss America 1985, singer, reporter, publisher 
 Victoria Wells Wulsin (born 1953), American physician and aspiring politician
 William Wells Brown (1814–1884), American abolitionist lecturer, novelist, playwright and historian 
 William Wells Newell (1839–1907), American folklorist, school teacher, minister and philosophy professor

See also 
 Welles (name)
 Welles (disambiguation)
 Wells (disambiguation)
 
 Bishop of Bath and Wells
 List of Bishops of Bath and Wells and precursor offices
 Wells baronets

References 

Given names
English-language surnames